Centerpoint (alternatively spelled centrepoint) may refer to:

 Centerpoint (geometry), a generalization of the median to two or more dimensions

Organizations
 CenterPoint Energy, an electric and natural gas utility in the U.S.A.
 CenterPoint Properties, Chicago industrial real estate developer
 Centrepoint (charity), a UK charitable trust for homeless young people
 Centrepoint Theatre, a theatre and theatre company in Palmerston North, New Zealand

Places
 Sydney Tower, also known as Centrepoint Tower, in Sydney, New South Wales, Australia
 Westfield Sydney, a shopping centre under the Sydney Tower
 Centerpoint Mall (Toronto), Ontario, Canada
 Centrepointe, a neighbourhood in Ottawa, Ontario, Canada
 Centre Point Sabah, in Kota Kinabalu, Sabah, Malaysia
 Centrepoint (commune), a former commune in Albany, New Zealand
 SM City Sta. Mesa, Manila, Philippines, formerly known as SM Centerpoint
 The Centrepoint, a shopping centre in Singapore
 Centre Point, an office building in central London, England
 Centerpoint, Ohio, United States, an unincorporated community
 Centerpointe Mall, Grand Rapids, Michigan, United States
 Centerpoint Medical Center, Independence, Missouri, United States
 CentrePointe, Lexington, Kentucky, United States, a building

See also
Center Point (disambiguation)